Umakant Chaudhary is a Nepalese politician and the former minister for Water Supply of Nepal. He was elected to the Pratinidhi Sabha in the 2017 election on behalf of the Nepali Congress.

He was appointed in 2004 as minister of state for agriculture and cooperation. In 2009 he became Health Minister. He hails from Bara and elected from Bara 1.

Electoral history

2017 legislative elections

1999 legislative elections

References

Living people
Nepali Congress politicians from Madhesh Province
Government ministers of Nepal
Place of birth missing (living people)
Nepal MPs 2017–2022
Nepal MPs 1999–2002
Members of the 1st Nepalese Constituent Assembly
1966 births